Kenneth Malcolm Carter  (28 March 1961 – 21 May 1986), was a British world class speedway rider. He rode for Newcastle Diamonds (1978), Halifax Dukes (1978–1985) and Bradford Dukes (1986). On Wednesday, 21 May 1986, he shot dead his wife, Pam, and then killed himself, orphaning their two young children in the process.

Career
Carter was born in Halifax, West Yorkshire. He was widely regarded as a future World Champion and became the World Pairs Champion with Peter Collins in 1983. He took on six-time World Champion Ivan Mauger as his manager in 1981 who set him up with a Weslake bike and Carter qualified for the 1981 World Final run in front of 92,500 fans at Wembley Stadium. He finished 5th in 1981 and repeated the result in 1982 in Los Angeles after a controversial Heat 14 exclusion following a coming together with defending champion (and eventual 1982 winner), arch rival Bruce Penhall in which Carter fell and was excluded for being the reason the race had to be stopped (Carter slid through the fence). Amazingly, Kenny finished 5th again in 1983 at Norden in West Germany.

Kenny Carter also won the British League Riders' Championship in 1981 and 1982.

Carter was British Champion in 1984 and 1985, and later that year appeared as a television commentator alongside Dave Lanning for the 1985 World Final at the Odsal Stadium in Bradford for which he had failed to qualify after breaking his leg in the Intercontinental Final in Sweden. Less than one year later, Carter shot dead his wife, Pamela, before turning the gun on himself at their home, Grey Horse Farm, in Bradshaw, West Yorkshire.

Outspoken and not afraid to stand up for himself, Kenny Carter was not universally popular with other riders, even those who were his team mates in the Halifax team or the England team. In a television interview during the 1984 British Final (which he won despite a broken right leg) he stated that some of his England team mates had been verbally criticising him for his desire to continue riding. Most of the riders' frustrations came from the wet track conditions, which they felt were dangerous to ride in.

Carter was also seen often talking to the referee of meetings either after being excluded from a race or to get his point of view across. His most famous joust with a referee came after his exclusion from Heat 14 of the 1982 World Final. After pleading his case he failed to change Torrie Kittlesen's mind. He then told Kittlesen that his decision had cost him the World Championship. Following this, Carter walked onto the track and stood at the starting tapes in a vain attempt to prevent the re-run heat going ahead without him, with most of the 40,000 strong crowd at the Los Angeles Coliseum (who were firmly behind home town hero Penhall) booing him loudly. Carter then had to be physically removed from the track by security personnel and his manager Ivan Mauger. Despite Carter's contention that Penhall had deliberately knocked him off his bike, amateur video footage of the incident later fully vindicated Kittlesen's decision, as it showed that although Penhall and Carter had been bumping each other all the way along the front straight, they had not touched in the turn leading up to Carter's fall.

Carter was the older brother of Grand Prix motorcycle road racer Alan Carter.

World Final Appearances

Individual World Championship
 1981 -  London, Wembley Stadium - 5th - 11pts
 1982 -  Los Angeles, Memorial Coliseum - 5th - 10pts
 1983 -  Norden, Motodrom Halbemond - 5th - 10pts

World Pairs Championship
 1982 -  Sydney, Liverpool City Raceway (with Peter Collins) - 2nd - 22pts (7)
 1983 -  Gothenburg, Ullevi (with Peter Collins) - Winner - 25pts (15)
 1985 -  Rybnik, Rybnik Municipal Stadium (with Kelvin Tatum) - 2nd - 27pts (14)

World Team Cup
 1981 -  Olching, Speedway Stadion Olching (with Dave Jessup / Chris Morton / John Davis / Gordon Kennett) - 2nd - 29pts (9)
 1983 -  Vojens, Speedway Center (with Michael Lee / Dave Jessup / Chris Morton / Peter Collins) - 2nd - 29pts (8)

References

External links
 Newcastle Speedway biography

1961 births
1986 suicides
Sportspeople from Halifax, West Yorkshire
English motorcycle racers
British speedway riders
British Speedway Championship winners
Halifax Dukes riders
Newcastle Diamonds riders
Speedway World Pairs Champions
Murder–suicides in the United Kingdom
Suicides by firearm in England